The Insurance Fraud Enforcement Department or IFED for short, is a task force formed by the City of London Police that tracks criminals who commit insurance fraud. The task force was founded in 2012 and is funded by a consortium of British and European insurance companies, including the Association of British Insurers, for £9 million during its first three years.

The IFED have been featured several times on BBC One's Claimed and Shamed.

See also
National Insurance Crime Bureau

References

External links
 Insurance Fraud Enforcement Department website

Task forces
City of London
City of London Police
Law enforcement agencies of the United Kingdom
Fraud organizations